Crudie is a settlement in Aberdeenshire, Scotland. It is situated on the A98. It has a primary school and a war memorial.

References

Villages in Aberdeenshire